Allano Brendon de Souza Lima (born 24 April 1995), simply known as Allano, is a Brazilian footballer who plays as a winger for Santa Clara.

Club career
Allano was born in Rio de Janeiro and finished his formation with Botafogo. He made his senior debut on 8 February 2014, starting in a 0–1 home loss against Friburguense for the Campeonato Carioca championship.

On 28 October 2014, Allano moved to Cruzeiro after having indiscipline problems at Fogão, and returned to youth football. Previously a left back, he was converted to an attacking midfielder at his new club.

Promoted to the main squad, Allano made his Série A debut on 3 June 2015, coming on as a second-half substitute for Willian in a 1–0 home win against Flamengo.

References

External links

 
 
 Cruzeiro profile 

1995 births
Living people
Footballers from Rio de Janeiro (city)
Brazilian footballers
Association football midfielders
Sport Club Corinthians Paulista players
Botafogo de Futebol e Regatas players
Cruzeiro Esporte Clube players
Esporte Clube Bahia players
G.D. Estoril Praia players
Bursaspor footballers
Ventforet Kofu players
Centro Sportivo Alagoano players
Campeonato Brasileiro Série A players
Campeonato Brasileiro Série B players
Primeira Liga players
Süper Lig players
J2 League players
Brazilian expatriate footballers
Expatriate footballers in Portugal
Brazilian expatriate sportspeople in Portugal
Expatriate footballers in Turkey
Brazilian expatriate sportspeople in Turkey
Expatriate footballers in Japan
Brazilian expatriate sportspeople in Japan